Carolina Actors Studio Theatre (CAST) was an independent non-profit theatre company located at 2424 North Davidson Street in Charlotte, North Carolina.  It was founded in 1992 by Charlotte acting instructor Ed Gilweit as an actor's teaching school.  In 2000 Gilweit's company partnered with a video and stage production company run by Michael Simmons called Victory Pictures, Inc., and then with the fledgling theatre group Another Roadside Performance Company run by Robert Lee Simmons, Michael Simmons' son.  Through this series of mergers, Gilweit and the Simmons' became the founders of the Carolina Actors Studio Theatre.  After Gilweit's death in 2002, Michael Simmons became the Managing Artistic Director.

CAST was noted for large-scale installations and elaborate sets with the goal of complete immersion of the audience in the reality of each play.  CAST always sought to obliterate the emotional distance between the actor and spectator, a technique they called "experiential theatre".  When attending a CAST performance, the experience of the spectator began from the moment they entered—or even approached—the theater.

History
In 2006, with the help of a board of directors recruited from Charlotte's arts community, CAST received a 501(c)(3) designation. Since 2008, CAST has also received financial support from the Arts & Science Council.

In the summer of 2010 CAST received a grant from the John S. and James L. Knight Foundation and the Arts & Science Council.  This allowed the company to move out of the cramped quarters they had occupied for eight years on Clement Avenue into a space at 2424 North Davidson in the NoDa neighborhood of Charlotte where it had all begun. The new location at NoDa contained three theater spaces including a Thrust stage, and a Theatre in the round. For the first time in CAST history there was a spacious bar and lobby area, dressing rooms, storage rooms, a conference room, and a fully equipped scenery-building shop.  The new theatre was officially launched in August 2011 with a production of August: Osage County, the Pulitzer Prize winning play by Tracy Letts.  It was the regional premier of that play and was a great critical success.

On June 6, 2014 the board of directors of CAST announced that after 64 productions and eight years of operation as a non-profit theatre, the theatre would close.  Reasons cited were financial pressures and dwindling attendance.

On June 21, 2014, despite winning the Charlotte Theatre of the Year award for three years running, and after a 24-year history, CAST shut its doors for the last time with a final performance of Rajiv Joseph's Gruesome Playground Injuries.

Awards
Creative Loafing
Creative Loafing is a publisher of newsweeklies and their associated websites focusing on local affairs, including arts and entertainment. CAST twice won Creative Loafing's Theatre of the Year Award.  CAST garnered many other awards from Creative Loafing including Best Drama and Best Director in addition to many technical awards.  A complete list of Creative Loafing awards which CAST has won over the years is shown below.

Metrolina Theatre Association
The Metrolina Theatre Association (MTA) is a Charlotte organization which gives awards each year to support and advocate for local theatre, and these awards are the major source of public recognition for theatres, shows, and individuals.  In 2009 Cast won the MTA award for Theatre Company of the Year and CAST's artistic director Michael R. Simmons won the award for Theatre Person of the Year. In 2011 CAST won the MTA awards for best show, actor, actress, and director. A complete list is shown below.

Selected reviews

References
Notes

Sources
 Blamy, David Jeffrey, Carolina Actors Studio Theatre and the Experiential Approach to Production Texas Tech University, May, 2011

External links
 Official website

Former theatres in the United States
Theatres in Charlotte, North Carolina
Theatre companies in Charlotte, North Carolina
Arts organizations established in 1992
Regional theatre in the United States